César Caillet Álvarez is a Chilean actor (bor 1974 in Temuco), studied in the Instituto chileno-francés of the city of Temuco. Graduated with a law degree, knowing that he would not pursue his degree, dedicated himself to acting. He studied Theater in the school of Fernando González, had a love–hate relationship with one of his teachers and today's semi-idol, Marcelo Alonso, and became a great actor at 29 years old. Made his debut in “Los Pincheira”, he became famous as the “cool” Jaime of “Ídolos” and after a role in “Los Capo”, ended up going to the drama-area of Canal 13, in Papi Ricky and the mini-series Héroes. Has worked in several Chilean soap operas, including Los Pincheira and ¿Dónde está Elisa?.

Filmography

Television

References

External links

1974 births
Chilean male television actors
Chilean male telenovela actors
Chilean male film actors
21st-century Chilean lawyers
Chilean people of French descent
Living people
People from Temuco